The Peninsula Museum of Art (PMA) is a 501(c)(3) non-profit art museum located in San Bruno, California.

History 
The Peninsula Museum of Art was founded by Ruth Waters and a group of working artists in 2003. It was first located at the Manor House in Twin Pines Park in Belmont, California. In 2004 it officially incorporated as the Peninsula Museum of Art and was granted 501(c)3 status. In 2005 a building fund was established with seed monies from Charles Homer. In 2013 the museum completed renovation on an 18,000-square-foot complex in Belmont, California which housed both the museum and the Peninsula Art Institute. Together, the museum and Institute comprised five gallery spaces, a library, a classroom, a store and 30 working artists’ studios. Ruth Waters was the museum's Founder, Chair and Executive Director from 2003–2020. The Burlingame location permanently closed in 2020 during the COVID 19 pandemic. In 2021 the museum found a new location in The Shops at Tanforan in San Bruno.

Collections 
The Peninsula Museum holds works from ecofeminist artist and activist Jo Hanson; founder Ruth Waters; and others.

See also 
 List of museums in the San Francisco Bay Area

References

External links
 Peninsula Museum of Art - official site

501(c)(3) organizations
2003 establishments in California
Arts organizations based in the San Francisco Bay Area
Art museums established in 2013
Art museums and galleries in California
Museums in San Mateo County, California
San Bruno, California